In mathematics, a vertex operator algebra (VOA) is an algebraic structure that plays an important role in two-dimensional conformal field theory and string theory.  In addition to physical applications, vertex operator algebras have proven useful in purely mathematical contexts such as monstrous moonshine and the geometric Langlands correspondence.

The related notion of vertex algebra was introduced by Richard Borcherds in 1986, motivated by a construction of an infinite-dimensional Lie algebra due to Igor Frenkel. In the course of this construction, one employs a Fock space that admits an action of vertex operators attached to elements of a lattice. Borcherds formulated the notion of vertex algebra by axiomatizing the relations between the lattice vertex operators, producing an algebraic structure that allows one to construct new Lie algebras by following Frenkel's method.

The notion of vertex operator algebra was introduced as a modification of the notion of vertex algebra, by Frenkel, James Lepowsky, and Arne Meurman in 1988, as part of their project to construct the moonshine module. They observed that many vertex algebras that appear 'in nature' carry an action of the Virasoro algebra, and satisfy a bounded-below property with respect to an energy operator.  Motivated by this observation, they added the Virasoro action and bounded-below property as axioms.

We now have post-hoc motivation for these notions from physics, together with several interpretations of the axioms that were not initially known. Physically, the vertex operators arising from holomorphic field insertions at points in two-dimensional conformal field theory admit operator product expansions when insertions collide, and these satisfy precisely the relations specified in the definition of vertex operator algebra. Indeed, the axioms of a vertex operator algebra are a formal algebraic interpretation of what physicists call chiral algebras (not to be confused with the more precise notion with the same name in mathematics) or "algebras of chiral symmetries", where these symmetries describe the Ward identities satisfied by a given conformal field theory, including conformal invariance.  Other formulations of the vertex algebra axioms include Borcherds's later work on singular commutative rings, algebras over certain operads on curves introduced by Huang, Kriz, and others, D-module-theoretic objects called chiral algebras introduced by Alexander Beilinson and Vladimir Drinfeld and factorization algebras, also introduced by Beilinson and Drinfeld. 

Important basic examples of vertex operator algebras include the lattice VOAs (modeling lattice conformal field theories), VOAs given by representations of affine Kac–Moody algebras (from the WZW model), the Virasoro VOAs, which are VOAs corresponding to representations of the Virasoro algebra, and the moonshine module V♮, which is distinguished by its monster symmetry.  More sophisticated examples such as affine W-algebras and the chiral de Rham complex on a complex manifold arise in geometric representation theory and mathematical physics.

Formal definition

Vertex algebra
A vertex algebra is a collection of data that satisfy certain axioms.

Data 
 a vector space , called the space of states.  The underlying field is typically taken to be the complex numbers, although Borcherds's original formulation allowed for an arbitrary commutative ring.
 an endomorphism , called "translation".
This structure has some alternative presentations:
 as a left-multiplication map . This is the 'state-to-field' map of the so-called state-field correspondence. The standard notation for the multiplication is

Axioms 
These data are required to satisfy the following axioms:

 Identity.
 Translation. , and for any ,

 Locality (Jacobi identity, or Borcherds identity). For any , there exists a positive integer  such that:

Equivalent formulations of locality axiom 
The Locality axiom has several equivalent formulations in the literature, e.g., Frenkel–Lepowsky–Meurman introduced the Jacobi identity:

where we define the formal delta series by:

Borcherds initially used the following two identities: for any vectors u, v, and w, and integers m and n we have

and
.

He later gave a more expansive version that is equivalent but easier to use: for any vectors u, v, and w, and integers m, n, and q we have

Finally, there is a formal function version of locality: For any , there is an element

Vertex operator algebra
A vertex operator algebra is a vertex algebra equipped with a conformal element , such that the vertex operator  is the weight two Virasoro field :

and satisfies the following properties:
In particular, the coefficients of this vertex operator endow  with an action of the Virasoro algebra with central charge .
 The identity  has degree 0, and the conformal element  has degree 2.
 .

A homomorphism of vertex algebras is a map of the underlying vector spaces that respects the additional identity, translation, and multiplication structure. Homomorphisms of vertex operator algebras have "weak" and "strong" forms, depending on whether they respect conformal vectors.

Commutative vertex algebras
A vertex algebra  is commutative if all vertex operators  commute with each other.

Hence the commutative vertex algebra equips  with the structure of a commutative unital algebra with derivation. Conversely, any commutative ring  with derivation  has a canonical vertex algebra structure, where we set , so that  restricts to a map  which is the multiplication map  with  the algebra product. If the derivation  vanishes, we may set  to obtain a vertex operator algebra concentrated in degree zero.

Any finite-dimensional vertex algebra is commutative.
 
Thus even the smallest examples of noncommutative vertex algebras require significant introduction.

Basic properties
The translation operator  in a vertex algebra induces infinitesimal symmetries on the product structure, and satisfies the following properties:

 
 
 
 (skew-symmetry) 

For a vertex operator algebra, the other Virasoro operators satisfy similar properties:

 
 
 (quasi-conformality)  for all .
 (Associativity, or Cousin property): For any , the element

Reconstruction: Let  be a vertex algebra, and let  be a set of vectors, with corresponding fields . Specifically,

More generally, if one is given a vector space  with an endomorphism  and vector , and one assigns to a set of vectors  a set of fields  that are mutually local, whose positive weight coefficients generate , and that satisfy the identity and translation conditions, then the previous formula describes a vertex algebra structure.

Operator product expansion 
In vertex algebra theory, due to associativity, we can abuse notation to write, for 

This is the operator product expansion. Equivalently,

where the equivalence relation  denotes equivalence up to regular terms.

Commonly used OPEs 
Here some OPEs frequently found in conformal field theory are recorded.

Examples from Lie algebras 
The basic examples come from infinite-dimensional Lie algebras.

Heisenberg vertex operator algebra 
A basic example of a noncommutative vertex algebra is the rank 1 free boson, also called the Heisenberg vertex operator algebra. It is "generated" by a single vector b, in the sense that by applying the coefficients of the field b(z) := Y(b,z) to the vector 1, we obtain a spanning set. The action of b0 is multiplication by zero, producing the "momentum zero" Fock representation V0 of the Heisenberg Lie algebra (generated by bn for integers n, with commutation relations [bn,bm]=n δn,–m), induced by the trivial representation of the subalgebra spanned by bn, n ≥ 0.

The Fock space V0 can be made into a vertex algebra by the following definition of the state-operator map on a basis  with each ,

where  denotes normal ordering of an operator . The vertex operators may also be written as a functional of a multivariable function f as:

if we understand that each term in the expansion of f is normal ordered.

The rank n free boson is given by taking an n-fold tensor product of the rank 1 free boson.  For any vector b in n-dimensional space, one has a field b(z) whose coefficients are elements of the rank n Heisenberg algebra, whose commutation relations have an extra inner product term: [bn,cm]=n (b,c) δn,–m.

The Heisenberg vertex operator algebra has a one-parameter family of conformal vectors with parameter  of conformal vectors  given by

with central charge .

When , there is the following formula for the Virasoro character:

This is the generating function for partitions, and is also written as q1/24 times the weight −1/2 modular form 1/η (the reciprocal of the Dedekind eta function).  The rank n free boson then has an n parameter family of Virasoro vectors, and when those parameters are zero, the character is qn/24 times the weight −n/2 modular form η−n.

Virasoro vertex operator algebra
Virasoro vertex operator algebras are important for two reasons: First, the conformal element in a vertex operator algebra canonically induces a homomorphism from a Virasoro vertex operator algebra, so they play a universal role in the theory.  Second, they are intimately connected to the theory of unitary representations of the Virasoro algebra, and these play a major role in conformal field theory.  In particular, the unitary Virasoro minimal models are simple quotients of these vertex algebras, and their tensor products provide a way to combinatorially construct more complicated vertex operator algebras.

The Virasoro vertex operator algebra is defined as an induced representation of the Virasoro algebra: If we choose a central charge c, there is a unique one-dimensional module for the subalgebra C[z]∂z + K for which K acts by cId, and C[z]∂z acts trivially, and the corresponding induced module is spanned by polynomials in L–n = –z−n–1∂z as n ranges over integers greater than 1.  The module then has partition function

.

This space has a vertex operator algebra structure, where the vertex operators are defined by:

The fact that the Virasoro field L(z) is local with respect to itself can be deduced from the formula for its self-commutator:

where c is the central charge.

Given a vertex algebra homomorphism from a Virasoro vertex algebra of central charge c to any other vertex algebra, the vertex operator attached to the image of ω automatically satisfies the Virasoro relations, i.e., the image of ω is a conformal vector.  Conversely, any conformal vector in a vertex algebra induces a distinguished vertex algebra homomorphism from some Virasoro vertex operator algebra.

The Virasoro vertex operator algebras are simple, except when c has the form 1–6(p–q)2/pq for coprime integers p,q strictly greater than 1 – this follows from Kac's determinant formula.  In these exceptional cases, one has a unique maximal ideal, and the corresponding quotient is called a minimal model.  When p = q+1, the vertex algebras are unitary representations of Virasoro, and their modules are known as discrete series representations.  They play an important role in conformal field theory in part because they are unusually tractable, and for small p, they correspond to well-known statistical mechanics systems at criticality, e.g., the Ising model, the tri-critical Ising model, the three-state Potts model, etc.  By work of Weiqang Wang concerning fusion rules, we have a full description of the tensor categories of unitary minimal models.  For example, when c=1/2 (Ising), there are three irreducible modules with lowest L0-weight 0, 1/2, and 1/16, and its fusion ring is Z[x,y]/(x2–1, y2–x–1, xy–y).

Affine vertex algebra 
By replacing the Heisenberg Lie algebra with an untwisted affine Kac–Moody Lie algebra (i.e., the universal central extension of the loop algebra on a finite-dimensional simple Lie algebra), one may construct the vacuum representation in much the same way as the free boson vertex algebra is constructed.  This algebra arises as the current algebra of the Wess–Zumino–Witten model, which produces the anomaly that is interpreted as the central extension.

Concretely, pulling back the central extension

along the inclusion  yields a split extension, and the vacuum module is induced from the one-dimensional representation of the latter on which a central basis element acts by some chosen constant called the "level".  Since central elements can be identified with invariant inner products on the finite type Lie algebra , one typically normalizes the level so that the Killing form has level twice the dual Coxeter number.  Equivalently, level one gives the inner product for which the longest root has norm 2.  This matches the loop algebra convention, where levels are discretized by third cohomology of simply connected compact Lie groups.

By choosing a basis Ja of the finite type Lie algebra, one may form a basis of the affine Lie algebra using Jan = Ja tn together with a central element K.  By reconstruction, we can describe the vertex operators by normal ordered products of derivatives of the fields

When the level is non-critical, i.e., the inner product is not minus one half of the Killing form, the vacuum representation has a conformal element, given by the Sugawara construction. For any choice of dual bases Ja, Ja with respect to the level 1 inner product, the conformal element is

At critical level, the conformal structure is destroyed, since the denominator is zero, but one may produce operators Ln for n ≥ –1 by taking a limit as k approaches criticality.

Modules
Much like ordinary rings, vertex algebras admit a notion of module, or representation.  Modules play an important role in conformal field theory, where they are often called sectors. A standard assumption in the physics literature is that the full Hilbert space of a conformal field theory decomposes into a sum of tensor products of left-moving and right-moving sectors:

That is, a conformal field theory has a vertex operator algebra of left-moving chiral symmetries, a vertex operator algebra of right-moving chiral symmetries, and the sectors moving in a given direction are modules for the corresponding vertex operator algebra.

Definition 
Given a vertex algebra V with multiplication Y, a V-module is a vector space M equipped with an action YM: V ⊗ M → M((z)), satisfying the following conditions:

 (Identity) YM(1,z) = IdM
 (Associativity, or Jacobi identity) For any u, v ∈ V, w ∈ M, there is an element

such that YM(u,z)YM(v,x)w and YM(Y(u,z–x)v,x)w
Equivalently, the following "Jacobi identity" holds:

The modules of a vertex algebra form an abelian category.  When working with vertex operator algebras, the previous definition is sometimes given the name weak -module, and genuine V-modules must respect the conformal structure given by the conformal vector . More precisely, they are required to satisfy the additional condition that L0 acts semisimply with finite-dimensional eigenspaces and eigenvalues bounded below in each coset of Z.  Work of Huang, Lepowsky, Miyamoto, and Zhang has shown at various levels of generality that modules of a vertex operator algebra admit a fusion tensor product operation, and form a braided tensor category.

When the category of V-modules is semisimple with finitely many irreducible objects, the vertex operator algebra V is called rational. Rational vertex operator algebras satisfying an additional finiteness hypothesis (known as Zhu's C2-cofiniteness condition) are known to be particularly well-behaved, and are called regular. In particular, if a VOA is holomorphic, that is, its representation category is equivalent to that of vector spaces, then its partition function is -invariant up to a constant. Huang showed that the category of modules of a regular VOA is a modular tensor category, and its fusion rules satisfy the Verlinde formula.

Heisenberg algebra modules 

Every irreducible, -graded Heisenberg algebra module with gradation bounded below is of this form.

The module category is not semisimple, since one may induce a representation of the abelian Lie algebra where b0 acts by a nontrivial Jordan block.  For the rank n free boson, one has an irreducible module Vλ for each vector λ in complex n-dimensional space.  Each vector b ∈ Cn yields the operator b0, and the Fock space Vλ is distinguished by the property that each such b0 acts as scalar multiplication by the inner product (b, λ).

Twisted modules 

Unlike ordinary rings, vertex algebras admit a notion of twisted module attached to an automorphism.  For an automorphism σ of order N, the action has the form V ⊗ M → M((z1/N)), with the following monodromy condition: if u ∈ V satisfies σ u = exp(2πik/N)u, then un = 0 unless n satisfies n+k/N ∈ Z (there is some disagreement about signs among specialists).  Geometrically, twisted modules can be attached to branch points on an algebraic curve with a ramified Galois cover.  In the conformal field theory literature, twisted modules are called twisted sectors, and are intimately connected with string theory on orbifolds.

Additional examples

Vertex operator algebra defined by an even lattice 
The lattice vertex algebra construction was the original motivation for defining vertex algebras. It is constructed by taking a sum of irreducible modules for the Heisenberg algebra corresponding to lattice vectors, and defining a multiplication operation by specifying intertwining operators between them. That is, if  is an even lattice (if the lattice is not even, the structure obtained is instead a vertex superalgebra), the lattice vertex algebra  decomposes into free bosonic modules as:

Lattice vertex algebras are canonically attached to double covers of even integral lattices, rather than the lattices themselves. While each such lattice has a unique lattice vertex algebra up to isomorphism, the vertex algebra construction is not functorial, because lattice automorphisms have an ambiguity in lifting.

The double covers in question are uniquely determined up to isomorphism by the following rule: elements have the form  for lattice vectors  (i.e., there is a map to  sending  to α that forgets signs), and multiplication satisfies the relations eαeβ = (–1)(α,β)eβeα. Another way to describe this is that given an even lattice , there is a unique (up to coboundary) normalised cocycle  with values  such that , where the normalization condition is that ε(α, 0) = ε(0, α) = 1 for all .

The vertex operator attached to lowest weight vector  in the Fock space  is

where  is a shorthand for the linear map that takes any element of the α-Fock space  to the monomial . The vertex operators for other elements of the Fock space are then determined by reconstruction.

As in the case of the free boson, one has a choice of conformal vector, given by an element s of the vector space , but the condition that the extra Fock spaces have integer L0 eigenvalues constrains the choice of s: for an orthonormal basis , the vector 1/2 xi,12 + s2 must satisfy  for all λ ∈ Λ, i.e., s lies in the dual lattice.

If the even lattice  is generated by its "root vectors" (those satisfying (α, α)=2), and any two root vectors are joined by a chain of root vectors with consecutive inner products non-zero then the vertex operator algebra is the unique simple quotient of the vacuum module of the affine Kac–Moody algebra of the corresponding simply laced simple Lie algebra at level one.  This is known as the Frenkel–Kac (or Frenkel–Kac–Segal) construction, and is based on the earlier construction by Sergio Fubini and Gabriele Veneziano of the tachyonic vertex operator in the dual resonance model. Among other features, the zero modes of the vertex operators corresponding to root vectors give a construction of the underlying simple Lie algebra, related to a presentation originally due to Jacques Tits.  In particular, one obtains a construction of all ADE type Lie groups directly from their root lattices. And this is commonly considered the simplest way to construct the 248-dimensional group E8.

Monster vertex algebra 
The monster vertex algebra  (also called the "moonshine module") is the key to Borcherds's proof of the Monstrous moonshine conjectures. It was constructed by Frenkel, Lepowsky, and Meurman in 1988. It is notable because its character is the j-invariant with no constant term, and its automorphism group is the monster group. It is constructed by orbifolding the lattice vertex algebra constructed from the Leech lattice by the order 2 automorphism induced by reflecting the Leech lattice in the origin. That is, one forms the direct sum of the Leech lattice VOA with the twisted module, and takes the fixed points under an induced involution. Frenkel, Lepowsky, and Meurman conjectured in 1988 that  is the unique holomorphic vertex operator algebra with central charge 24, and partition function . This conjecture is still open.

Chiral de Rham complex 
Malikov, Schechtman, and Vaintrob showed that by a method of localization, one may canonically attach a bcβγ (boson–fermion superfield) system to a smooth complex manifold. This complex of sheaves has a distinguished differential, and the global cohomology is a vertex superalgebra. Ben-Zvi, Heluani, and Szczesny showed that a Riemannian metric on the manifold induces an N=1 superconformal structure, which is promoted to an N=2 structure if the metric is Kähler and Ricci-flat, and a hyperkähler structure induces an N=4 structure. Borisov and Libgober showed that one may obtain the two-variable elliptic genus of a compact complex manifold from the cohomology of the Chiral de Rham complex. If the manifold is Calabi–Yau, then this genus is a weak Jacobi form.

Vertex operator superalgebras 
By allowing the underlying vector space to be a superspace (i.e., a Z/2Z-graded vector space ) one can define a vertex superalgebra by the same data as a vertex algebra, with 1 in V+ and T an even operator.  The axioms are essentially the same, but one must incorporate suitable signs into the locality axiom, or one of the equivalent formulations.  That is, if a and b are homogeneous, one compares Y(a,z)Y(b,w) with εY(b,w)Y(a,z), where ε is –1 if both a and b are odd and 1 otherwise.  If in addition there is a Virasoro element ω in the even part of V2, and the usual grading restrictions are satisfied, then V is called a vertex operator superalgebra.

One of the simplest examples is the vertex operator superalgebra generated by a single free fermion ψ.  As a Virasoro representation, it has central charge 1/2, and decomposes as a direct sum of Ising modules of lowest weight 0 and 1/2.  One may also describe it as a spin representation of the Clifford algebra on the quadratic space t1/2C[t,t−1](dt)1/2 with residue pairing.  The vertex operator superalgebra is holomorphic, in the sense that all modules are direct sums of itself, i.e., the module category is equivalent to the category of vector spaces.

The tensor square of the free fermion is called the free charged fermion, and by boson–fermion correspondence, it is isomorphic to the lattice vertex superalgebra attached to the odd lattice Z. This correspondence has been used by Date–Jimbo–Kashiwara-Miwa to construct soliton solutions to the KP hierarchy of nonlinear PDEs.

Superconformal structures 
The Virasoro algebra has some supersymmetric extensions that naturally appear in superconformal field theory and superstring theory.  The N=1, 2, and 4 superconformal algebras are of particular importance.

Infinitesimal holomorphic superconformal transformations of a supercurve (with one even local coordinate z and N odd local coordinates θ1,...,θN) are generated by the coefficients of a super-stress–energy tensor T(z, θ1, ..., θN).

When N=1, T has odd part given by a Virasoro field L(z), and even part given by a field

subject to commutation relations

 
 

By examining the symmetry of the operator products, one finds that there are two possibilities for the field G: the indices n are either all integers, yielding the Ramond algebra, or all half-integers, yielding the Neveu–Schwarz algebra.  These algebras have unitary discrete series representations at central charge

and unitary representations for all c greater than 3/2, with lowest weight h only constrained by h≥ 0 for Neveu–Schwarz and h ≥ c/24 for Ramond.

An N=1 superconformal vector in a vertex operator algebra V of central charge c is an odd element τ ∈ V of weight 3/2, such that

G−1/2τ =  ω, and the coefficients of G(z) yield an action of the N=1 Neveu–Schwarz algebra at central charge c.

For N=2 supersymmetry, one obtains even fields L(z) and J(z), and odd fields G+(z) and G−(z). The field J(z) generates an action of the Heisenberg algebras (described by physicists as a U(1) current). There are both Ramond and Neveu–Schwarz N=2 superconformal algebras, depending on whether the indexing on the G fields is integral or half-integral.  However, the U(1) current gives rise to a one-parameter family of isomorphic superconformal algebras interpolating between Ramond and Neveu–Schwartz, and this deformation of structure is known as spectral flow.  The unitary representations are given by discrete series with central charge c = 3-6/m for integers m at least 3, and a continuum of lowest weights for c > 3.

An N=2 superconformal structure on a vertex operator algebra is a pair of odd elements τ+, τ− of weight 3/2, and an even element μ of weight 1 such that τ± generate G±(z), and μ generates J(z).

For N=3 and 4, unitary representations only have central charges in a discrete family, with c=3k/2 and 6k, respectively, as k ranges over positive integers.

Additional constructions 
 Fixed point subalgebras: Given an action of a symmetry group on a vertex operator algebra, the subalgebra of fixed vectors is also a vertex operator algebra.  In 2013, Miyamoto proved that two important finiteness properties, namely Zhu's condition C2 and regularity, are preserved when taking fixed points under finite solvable group actions.
 Current extensions: Given a vertex operator algebra and some modules of integral conformal weight, one may under favorable circumstances describe a vertex operator algebra structure on the direct sum.  Lattice vertex algebras are a standard example of this.  Another family of examples are framed VOAs, which start with tensor products of Ising models, and add modules that correspond to suitably even codes.
 Orbifolds: Given a finite cyclic group acting on a holomorphic VOA, it is conjectured that one may construct a second holomorphic VOA by adjoining irreducible twisted modules and taking fixed points under an induced automorphism, as long as those twisted modules have suitable conformal weight.  This is known to be true in special cases, e.g., groups of order at most 3 acting on lattice VOAs.
 The coset construction (due to Goddard, Kent, and Olive): Given a vertex operator algebra V of central charge c and a set S of vectors, one may define the commutant C(V,S) to be the subspace of vectors v strictly commute with all fields coming from S, i.e., such that Y(s,z)v ∈ V[[z]] for all s ∈ S.  This turns out to be a vertex subalgebra, with Y, T, and identity inherited from V.   and if S is a VOA of central charge cS, the commutant is a VOA of central charge c–cS.  For example, the embedding of SU(2) at level k+1 into the tensor product of two SU(2) algebras at levels k and 1 yields the Virasoro discrete series with p=k+2, q=k+3, and this was used to prove their existence in the 1980s.  Again with SU(2), the embedding of level k+2 into the tensor product of level k and level 2 yields the N=1 superconformal discrete series.
 BRST reduction: For any degree 1 vector v satisfying v02=0, the cohomology of this operator has a graded vertex superalgebra structure.  More generally, one may use any weight 1 field whose residue has square zero.  The usual method is to tensor with fermions, as one then has a canonical differential.  An important special case is quantum Drinfeld–Sokolov reduction applied to affine Kac–Moody algebras to obtain affine W-algebras as degree 0 cohomology.  These W algebras also admit constructions as vertex subalgebras of free bosons given by kernels of screening operators.

Related algebraic structures
 If one considers only the singular part of the OPE in a vertex algebra, one arrives at the definition of a Lie conformal algebra. Since one is often only concerned with the singular part of the OPE, this makes Lie conformal algebras a natural object to study. There is a functor from vertex algebras to Lie conformal algebras that forgets the regular part of OPEs, and it has a left adjoint, called the "universal vertex algebra" functor. Vacuum modules of affine Kac–Moody algebras and Virasoro vertex algebras are universal vertex algebras, and in particular, they can be described very concisely once the background theory is developed.
 There are several generalizations of the notion of vertex algebra in the literature. Some mild generalizations involve a weakening of the locality axiom to allow monodromy, e.g., the abelian intertwining algebras of Dong and Lepowsky. One may view these roughly as vertex algebra objects in a braided tensor category of graded vector spaces, in much the same way that a vertex superalgebra is such an object in the category of super vector spaces. More complicated generalizations relate to q-deformations and representations of quantum groups, such as in work of Frenkel–Reshetikhin, Etingof–Kazhdan, and Li.
 Beilinson and Drinfeld introduced a sheaf-theoretic notion of chiral algebra that is closely related to the notion of vertex algebra, but is defined without using any visible power series. Given an algebraic curve X, a chiral algebra on X is a DX-module A equipped with a multiplication operation  on X×X that satisfies an associativity condition. They also introduced an equivalent notion of factorization algebra that is a system of quasicoherent sheaves on all finite products of the curve, together with a compatibility condition involving pullbacks to the complement of various diagonals. Any translation-equivariant chiral algebra on the affine line can be identified with a vertex algebra by taking the fiber at a point, and there is a natural way to attach a chiral algebra on a smooth algebraic curve to any vertex operator algebra.

See also
 Operator algebra

Notes

Citations

Sources

Conformal field theory
Lie algebras
Non-associative algebra